Empress Dowager Li (李太后, personal name unknown) (died 965) was the mother of Meng Chang, the last emperor of the Chinese Five Dynasties and Ten Kingdoms period state Later Shu.  She was a concubine of Meng Chang's father Meng Zhixiang (Emperor Gaozu).

Background 
It is not known when the future Empress Dowager Li was born, but it is known that she was from Taiyuan.  At one point, she became a concubine of Li Cunxu — the future founding emperor of Later Tang and, at that time, the heir to Li Keyong the Prince of Jin.  Sometime later, she was awarded to the Jin official Meng Zhixiang as a concubine of his, possibly as an attendant to Li Keyong's daughter, whom Li Keyong gave in marriage to Meng as Meng's wife.

As Meng Zhixiang's concubine 
In 918 or 919, there was a time when Lady Li dreamed of a star falling into her abdomen.  She informed this dream to Meng Zhixiang's wife (who would later, after Later Tang's founding in 923, be created the Grand Princess Qionghua), who believed this to be a favorable omen.  The future princess thus had her attend to Meng.  She gave birth to his third son Meng Renzan in late 919.

In 934, Meng Zhixiang, who then carried the title of Prince of Shu as a Later Tang subject, declared himself Emperor of Shu.  With Grand Princess Qionghua having died by that point, he posthumously honored her as empress, and created Lady Li an imperial consort, initially with the rank of Furen (夫人), and then the greater title Guifei (貴妃).

As empress dowager 
Meng Zhixiang died in later 934, and Meng Renzan, who then changed his name to Meng Chang, took the throne.  In 935, he honored Consort Li as empress dowager.

Empress Dowager Li was said to be intelligent and of good judgment.  However, there were few references made to her being involved in Meng Chang's governance.  The one exception was a reference in 957, when she became worried that the Later Shu military commands were in the hands of the wrong people.  She stated to Meng Chang:

Meng Chang did not listen to her, however.

After Later Shu's fall 
In 964, Song Dynasty conquered Later Shu.  Meng Chang, who surrendered to the Song forces, was taken to the Song capital Kaifeng, as was Empress Dowager Li.  After they arrived in Kaifeng in 965, Song's Emperor Taizu treated them with respect, and referred to Empress Dowager Li as "mother of the State."  He said to her, "Mother of the State, please treat yourself well and do not worry.  If you missed your home land, I will find a day to have you escorted back there."  Empress Dowager Li pointed out that she was from Taiyuan and wanted to retire there.  As Taiyuan was then under the control of Song's rival state Northern Han, which Emperor Taizu was planning to conquer, Emperor Taizu viewed her remarks as good omen and was very pleased, informing her that he would allow her to do so as soon as he conquered Northern Han.  He also greatly rewarded her with wealth.

However, Meng Chang died a few days after arriving at Kaifeng.  Empress Dowager Li did not weep for him, but instead poured wine on the ground, stating:

She stopped eating, and died several days later.  Emperor Taizu was saddened by her death, and had both Meng Chang and her buried at Luoyang in a grand ceremony.

Notes and references 

 New History of the Five Dynasties, vol. 64.
 History of Song, vol. 479.
 Zizhi Tongjian, vols. 279, 293.
 Continuation to the Zizhi Tongjian, vol. 4.
 Spring and Autumn Annals of the Ten Kingdoms, vol. 50.

965 deaths
Year of birth unknown
People from Taiyuan
Jin (Later Tang precursor) people born during Tang
Later Tang people
Later Shu people
Song dynasty people
Five Dynasties and Ten Kingdoms empresses dowager
Suicides in the Song dynasty